Newbury previously (Newbir in 1783) is a town located in the parish of Saint George, Barbados. The town is located about 8km North-East of Bridgetown.

References 

Populated places in Barbados